Supersessionism, also called replacement theology or fulfillment theology, is a Christian theology which describes the theological conviction that the Christian Church has superseded the Jews and the nation of Israel, assuming their role as God's covenanted people, thus asserting that the New Covenant through Jesus Christ has superseded or replaced the Mosaic covenant exclusive to Jews. Supersessionist theology also holds that the universal Christian Church has succeeded ancient Israel as God's true Israel and that Christians have succeeded the ancient Israelites as the people of God.

Often claimed by later Christians to have originated with Paul the Apostle in the New Testament, supersessionism has formed a core tenet of Eastern Orthodox, Roman Catholic and Protestant churches for the majority of their history. Many early Church Fathers—including Justin Martyr and Augustine of Hippo—were supersessionist.

Most historic Christian Churches, including the Roman Catholic Church, Methodist Churches and Reformed Churches, hold that the Old Covenant has three components: ceremonial, moral, and civil ( covenant theology). They teach that while the ceremonial and civil (judicial) laws have been fulfilled, the moral law of the Ten Commandments continues to bind Christian believers. Since the 19th century, certain Christian communities, such as the Plymouth Brethren, have espoused dispensationalist theology as contrasted to supersessionism and covenant theology. Additionally, as part of Christian–Jewish reconciliation, the Roman Catholic Church has placed an increased emphasis on the shared history between Christianity and the modern Jewish faith.

Rabbinic Judaism disregards supersessionism as offensive to Jewish history. Islam teaches that it is the final and most authentic expression of Abrahamic monotheism, superseding both Judaism and Christianity. The Islamic doctrine of tahrif teaches that earlier monotheistic scriptures or earlier interpretations of them have been corrupted by later interpretations of them, while the Quran presents a pure version of their divine message.

Etymology
The word supersessionism comes from the English verb to supersede, from the Latin verb sedeo, sedere, sedi, sessum, "to sit", plus super, "upon". It thus signifies one thing being replaced or supplanted by another.

Throughout Church history, many Christian theologians saw the New Covenant in Christ as a replacement for the Mosaic Covenant and the Church as the new people of God. The word supersession is used by Sydney Thelwall in the title of chapter three of his 1870 translation of Tertullian's An Answer to the Jews.

Christian views

The New Testament

In the New Testament, Jesus and others repeatedly give Jews priority in their mission, as in Jesus's expression of him coming to the Jews rather than to Gentiles and in Paul the Apostle's formula "first for the Jew, then for the Gentile". Yet after the death of Jesus, the inclusion of the Gentiles as equals in this burgeoning sect of Judaism also caused problems, particularly when it came to Gentiles keeping the Mosaic Law, which was both a major issue at the Council of Jerusalem and a theme of Paul's Epistle to the Galatians, though the relationship of Paul and Judaism is still disputed today.

Paul's views on the Jews are complex, but he is generally regarded as the first person to make the claim that by not accepting claims of Jesus's divinity, Jews disqualified themselves from salvation. Paul himself was born a Jew, but after a conversion experience he came to accept Jesus's divinity later in his life. In the opinion of Roman Catholic ex-priest James Carroll, accepting Jesus's divinity, for Paul, was dichotomous with being a Jew. His personal conversion and his understanding of the dichotomy between being Jewish and accepting Jesus's divinity, was the religious philosophy he wanted to see adopted among other Jews of his time. However, New Testament scholar N.T. Wright argues that Paul saw his faith in Jesus as precisely the fulfillment of his Judaism, not that there was any tension between being Jewish and Christian. Christians quickly adopted Paul's views.

For most of Christian history, supersessionism has been the mainstream interpretation of the New Testament of all three major historical traditions within Christianity – Orthodox, Roman Catholic and Protestant. The text most often evident in favor of the supersessionist view is Hebrews 8:13: "In speaking of 'a new covenant' [Jer. 31.31–32] he has made the first one obsolete."

Church Fathers
Many Early Christian commentators taught that the Old Covenant was fulfilled and superseded by the New Covenant in Christ, for instance Justin Martyr wrote that the "true spiritual Israel" referred to those who had "been led to God through this crucified Christ". Irenaeus taught that, while the New Covenant had superseded the old, the moral law underlying the Law of Moses continued to stand in the New Covenant. Whereas, Tertullian believed that the New Covenant brought with it a new law, writing: "Who else, therefore, are understood but we, who, fully taught by the new law, observe these practices, the old law being obliterated, the coming of whose abolition the action itself demonstrates. ...Therefore, as we have shown above that the coming cessation of the old law and of the carnal circumcision was declared, so, too, the observance of the new law and the spiritual circumcision has shone out into the voluntary observances of peace."

Augustine of Hippo followed the views of the earlier Church Fathers but emphasized the importance to Christianity of the continued existence of the separate Rabbinic Jewish faith: "The Jews ... are thus by their own Scriptures a testimony to us that we have not forged the prophecies about Christ." The Catholic church built its system of eschatology on his theology, where Christ rules the earth spiritually through his triumphant church. Augustine, however, also mentioned to "love" the Jews as a means to convert them to Christianity. Jeremy Cohen, followed by John Y. B. Hood and James Carroll, sees this as having had decisive social consequences, with Carroll saying, "It is not too much to say that, at this juncture, Christianity 'permitted' Judaism to endure because of Augustine."

Roman Catholicism

Supersessionism is not the name of any official Roman Catholic Church doctrine and the word appears in no Church documents, but official Catholic teaching has reflected varying levels of supersessionist thought throughout its history, especially prior to the mid-twentieth century. The theology that the Jews dissent by continuing to exist outside the Church is extensive in Catholic liturgy and literature. The Second Vatican Council (1962–65) marked a shift in emphasis of official Catholic teaching about Judaism, a shift which may be described as a move from "hard" to "soft" supersessionism, to use the terminology of David Novak.

Prior to Vatican II, Catholic doctrine on the matter was characterized by "displacement" or "substitution" theologies, according to which the Church and its New Covenant took the place of Judaism and its "Old Covenant", the latter being rendered void by the coming of Jesus. The nullification of the Old Covenant was often explained in terms of the "deicide charge" that Jews forfeited their covenantal relationship with God by executing the divine Christ. As recently as 1943, Pope Pius XII stated in his encyclical Mystici corporis Christi:

At the Second Vatican Council, which was convened two decades after the Holocaust, a different framework emerged on how Catholics should think about the status of the Jewish covenant. The declaration Nostra aetate, which was promulgated in 1965, made several statements which signaled a shift away from "hard supersessionist" replacement thinking which posited that the Jews’ covenant was no longer acknowledged by God. Retrieving Paul's language in chapter 11 of his Epistle to the Romans, the declaration states, "God holds the Jews most dear for the sake of their Fathers; He does not repent of the gifts He makes or of the calls He issues. …Although the Church is the new people of God, the Jews should not be presented as rejected or accursed by God, as if this followed from the Holy Scriptures." Notably, a draft of the declaration contained a passage which originally called for "the entry of that [Jewish] people into the fullness of the people of God established by Christ;" however, at the suggestion of Catholic priest (and convert from Judaism) John M. Oesterreicher, it was replaced in the final promulgated version with the following language: “the Church awaits that day, known to God alone, on which all peoples will address the Lord in a single voice and ‘serve him shoulder to shoulder’ (Zeph 3:9).”

Further developments in Catholic thinking on the covenantal status of Jews were led by Pope John Paul II. Among his most noteworthy statements on the matter is that which occurred during his historic visit to the synagogue in Mainz (1980), where he called Jews the "people of God of the Old Covenant, which has never been abrogated by God (cf. Romans 11:29, "for the gifts and the calling of God are irrevocable" [NRSV])." In 1997, John Paul II again affirmed the Jews’ covenantal status: “This people continues in spite of everything to be the people of the covenant and, despite human infidelity, the Lord is faithful to his covenant.”

Cardinal Joseph Ratzinger, who later became Pope Benedict XVI writes in his 1999 work Many Religions - One Covenant that "the Sinai [Mosaic] Covenant is indeed superseded."

The post-Vatican II shift toward acknowledging the Jews as a covenanted people has led to heated discussions in the Catholic Church over the issue of missionary activity directed toward Jews, with some Catholics theologians with Cardinal Avery Dulles reasoning that "if Christ is the redeemer of the world, every tongue should confess him", while others vehemently oppose "targeting Jews for conversion". Weighing in on this matter, Cardinal Walter Kasper, then President of the Pontifical Commission for Religious Relations with the Jews, reaffirmed the validity of the Jews’ covenant and then continued: In his apostolic exhortation Evangelii gaudium (2013), Pope Francis emphasized communal heritage and mutual respect for each other, writing: 

Similarly, the words of Cardinal Kasper, "God's grace, which is the grace of Jesus Christ according to our faith, is available to all. Therefore, the Church believes that Judaism, [as] the faithful response of the Jewish people to God's irrevocable covenant, is salvific for them, because God is faithful to his promises," highlight the covenantal relationship of God with the Jewish people, but differs from Pope Francis in calling the Jewish faith salvific. In 2011, Kasper specifically repudiated the notion of "displacement" theology, clarifying that the "New Covenant for Christians is not the replacement (substitution), but the fulfillment of the Old Covenant."

These statements by Catholic officials signal a remaining point of debate, wherein some adhere to a movement away from supersessionism, and others remain with a "soft" notion of supersessionism. Traditionalist Catholic groups, such as the Society of St. Pius X, strongly oppose the theological developments concerning Judaism made at Vatican II and retain "hard" supersessionist views. Even among mainstream Catholic groups and official Catholic teaching, elements of "soft" supersessionism remain. The Catechism of the Catholic Church refers to a future corporate repentance on the part of Jews: The glorious Messiah's coming is suspended at every moment of history until his recognition by 'all Israel,' for 'a hardening has come upon part of Israel' in their 'unbelief' toward Jesus [Rom 11:20-26; cf. Mt 23:39]. ... The 'full inclusion' of the Jews in the Messiah's salvation, in the wake of 'the full number of the Gentiles' [Rom 11:12, 25; cf. Lk 21:24], will enable the People of God to achieve 'the measure of the stature of the fullness of Christ,' in which 'God may be all in all.' The Church teaches that there is an integral continuity between the covenants rather than a rupture.
In the Second Vatican Council's Lumen gentium (1964), the Church stated that God "chose the race of Israel as a people" and "set up a covenant" with them, instructing them and making them holy. However, "all these things. …were done by way of preparation and as a figure of that new and perfect covenant" instituted by and ratified in Christ (no. 9). Vatican II also affirmed, "the Church is the new people of God" without being "Israel according to the flesh", the Jewish people.
In Notes on the Correct Way to Present the Jews and Judaism (1985), the Church stated that the "Church and Judaism cannot then be seen as two parallel ways of salvation and the Church must witness to Christ as the Redeemer of all."

Protestantism
Modern Protestants hold to a range of positions on supersessionism and the relationship between the Church and the Jewish people. These differences arise from dissimilar literal versus figurative approaches to understanding the relationships between the covenants of the Bible, particularly the relationship between the covenants of the Old Testament and the New Covenant.

After the establishment of the political state of Israel in the wake of the Holocaust, mainstream Christian theologians and denominations began to re-examine supersessionism and some communities came to outright reject the doctrine. The prominent Protestant alternatives to supersessionism are covenant theology, New Covenant theology, classical dispensationalism, progressive dispensationalism and covenant premillennialism. Another alternative, dual-covenant theology, contrasts with supersessionism by holding that the Mosaic covenant remains valid for Talmudic Jews.

Extensive discussion is found in Christian views on the Old Covenant and in the respective articles for each of these viewpoints: for example, there is a section within dispensationalism detailing that perspective's concept of Israel. Differing approaches influence how the land promise in Genesis 12, 15 and 17 is understood, whether it is interpreted literally or figuratively, both with regard to the land and the identity of people who inherit it.

Adherents to these various views are not restricted to a single denomination though some traditions teach a certain view. Classical covenant theology is taught within the Presbyterian and Continental Reformed traditions. Methodist hermeneutics traditionally use a variation of this, known as Wesleyan covenant theology, which is consistent with Arminian soteriology. In the United States, a difference of approach has been perceived between the Presbyterian Church and the Episcopal Church, the Evangelical Lutheran Church in America, and the United Methodist Church which have worked to develop a non-supersessionist theology.

Paul van Buren developed a thoroughly nonsupersessionist position, in contrast to Karl Barth, his mentor. He wrote, "The reality of the Jewish people, fixed in history by the reality of their election, in their faithfulness in spite of their unfaithfulness, is as solid and sure as that of the gentile church."

Mormonism
Mormonism rejects supersessionism.

Jewish and Muslim views

Rabbinic Judaism rejects supersessionism, only discussing the topic as an idea upheld by Christian and Muslim theologians. Some Modern Jews are offended by the traditional Christian belief in supersessionism, as they believe it undermines the history of their religion.

In its canonical form, the Islamic doctrine of tahrif teaches that Jewish and Christian scriptures or their interpretations have been corrupted, which has obscured the divine message that they originally contained. According to this doctrine, the Quran both points out and corrects these supposed errors introduced by previous corruption of monotheistic scriptures, which makes it the final and most pure divine revelation.

Sandra Toenis Keiting argues that Islam was supersessionist from its inception, advocating the view that the Quranic revelations would "replace the corrupted scriptures possessed by other communities", and that early Islamic scriptures display a "clear theology of revelation that is concerned with establishing the credibility of the nascent community" viz-a-viz other religions. In contrast, Abdulaziz Sachedina has argued that Islamic supersessionism stems not from the Quran or hadith, but rather from the work of Muslim jurists who reinterpreted the Quranic message about islam (in its literal meaning of "submission") being "the only true religion with God" into an argument about the religion of Islam being superior to other faiths, thereby providing theoretical justification for Muslim political dominance and a wider interpretation of the notion of jihad.

In Islamic legal exegesis (tafsir), abrogation (naskh) is the theory developed to resolve contradictory Quranic revelation by amending the earlier revelation. Only Quran 2:106 uses a form of the word naskh (specifically "nanskh" meaning "we abrogate"). Q2:106 indicates of two varieties of abrogation: "supersession" – the "suspension" and replacement of the old verse without its elimination – or "suppression" – the nullification of the old verse from the written Quran (mus'haf).

Types

Both Christian and Jewish theologians have identified different types of supersessionism in the Christian reading of the Bible.

R. Kendall Soulen notes three categories of supersessionism identified by Christian theologians: punitive, economic, and structural:
 Punitive supersessionism is represented by such Christian thinkers as Hippolytus of Rome, Origen, and Martin Luther. It is the view that Jews who reject Jesus as the Jewish Messiah are consequently condemned by God, forfeiting the promises otherwise due to them under the covenants.
 Economic supersessionism is used in the technical theological sense of function (see economic Trinity). It is the view that the practical purpose of the nation of Israel in God's plan is replaced by the role of the Church. It is represented by writers such as Justin Martyr, Augustine, and Barth.
 Structural supersessionism is Soulen's term for the de facto marginalization of the Old Testament as normative for Christian thought. In his words, "Structural supersessionism refers to the narrative logic of the standard model whereby it renders the Hebrew Scriptures largely indecisive for shaping Christian convictions about how God's works as Consummator and Redeemer engage humankind in universal and enduring ways." Soulen's terminology is used by Craig A. Blaising, in "The Future of Israel as a Theological Question".

These three views are neither mutually exclusive, nor logically dependent, and it is possible to hold all of them or any one with or without the others. The work of Matthew Tapie attempts a further clarification of the language of supersessionism in modern theology that Peter Ochs has called "the clearest teaching on supersessionism in modern scholarship." Tapie argued that Soulen's view of economic supersessionism shares important similarities with those of Jules Isaac's thought (the French-Jewish historian well known for his identification of "the teaching of contempt" in the Christian tradition) and can ultimately be traced to the medieval concept of the "cessation of the law" – the idea that Jewish observance of the ceremonial law (Sabbath, circumcision, and dietary laws) ceases to have a positive significance for Jews after the passion of Christ. According to Soulen, Christians today often repudiate supersessionism but they do not always carefully examine just what that is supposed to mean. Soulen thinks Tapie's work is a remedy to this situation.

See also

 Abrogation of Old Covenant laws
 Anti-Judaism
 Antinomianism
 Antisemitism in Christianity
 Antisemitism in Islam
 Christian anti-Judaism
 Christianity and Judaism
 Christian–Jewish reconciliation
 Christian observances of Jewish holidays
 Christian views on the Old Covenant
 Christian Zionism
 Circumcision controversy in early Christianity
 Conversion of the Jews
 Criticism of Judaism
 Judaizers
 New Covenant theology
 Philo-Semitism
 Religious antisemitism
 Sabbatarianism

References

Citations

Bibliography

Further reading
 David Nirenberg  
Tapie, Matthew A. Aquinas on Israel and the Church: The Question of Supersessionism in the Theology of Thomas Aquinas. Pickwick/Wipf & Stock, 2014. 1st chapter
 Vlach, Michael J. The Church as a Replacement of Israel: An Analysis of Supersessionism.  PhD Dissertation. Southeastern Baptist Theological Seminary, 2004. content: 6 pg.pdf, 1.chapter: 24 pg.pdf
Aguzzi, Steven D. "Israel, the Church, and Eschatological Hope: Moltmann's Millenarianism and the Jewish-Catholic Question." PhD Dissertation. Duquesne University, 2014.
 Charles D. Provan.  The Church Is Israel Now: The Transfer Of Conditional Privilege.  (supports supersessionism)

External links

 Michael Forrest and David Palm, "All in the Family: Christians, Jews and God", Laywitness magazine, July–August, 2009. An article opposing "extreme" supersessionism and dual covenant theology.
 "Why Catholics for Israel?" an article by Catholics opposing supersessionism.
 Michael J. Vlach. Supersession Info Page (opposing supersessionism)
 "The Attacks of Replacement Theology" (opposing supersessionism)
 Mikael Knighton. "False Gospel: Supersessionism (Replacement Theology)"  (opposing supersessionism)

 
Catholic doctrines
Christian terminology
Christianity and Judaism related controversies
Mosaic law in Christian theology